Plossig is a village and a former municipality in Wittenberg district in Saxony-Anhalt, Germany. Since 1 January 2011, it is part of the town Annaburg. The municipality belonged to the administrative community (Verwaltungsgemeinschaft) of Annaburg-Prettin.

Geography
Plossig lies about 12 km south of Jessen on the edge of the Düben Heath Nature Park.

Economy and Transportation
Federal Highway (Bundesstraße) B 187 between Jessen and Wittenberg lies 12 km away.

References

External links
Verwaltungsgemeinschaft's website

Former municipalities in Saxony-Anhalt
Annaburg